Richard F. H. Polt is a professor of philosophy at Xavier University in Cincinnati, Ohio. He has written about and translated works by Martin Heidegger. Polt is a typewriter enthusiast active on the Typosphere and a former editor of the quarterly ETCetera publication about manual typewriters. He is the author of three books, and he also contributed to the 2016 documentary California Typewriter that features Tom Hanks.

Works

As author
 Time and Trauma: Thinking through Heidegger in the Thirties (London: Rowman ¶ Littlefield International Ltd., 2019)
 The Typewriter Revolution: A Typist's Companion for the 21st Century (Woodstock, VT: The Countryman Press, 2015)
 The Emergency of Being: On Heidegger's 'Contributions to Philosophy (Ithaca: Cornell University Press, 2006)
 Heidegger: An Introduction (Ithaca: Cornell University Press, 1999)Editor:'''
 Heidegger's 'Being and Time': Critical Essays (Lanham, MD: Rowman & Littlefield, 2005)
 Richard Polt and Gregory Fried (eds.), A Companion to Heidegger's 'Introduction to Metaphysics'" (New Haven: Yale University Press, 2001)

As translator
 Martin Heidegger, Being and Truth, trans. by Gregory Fried and Richard Polt (Bloomington: Indiana University Press, 2010)
 Martin Heidegger, An Introduction to Metaphysics, trans. by Gregory Fried and Richard Polt (New Haven & London: Yale University Press, 2000)
 Friedrich Nietzsche, Twilight of the Idols (Indianapolis: Hackett Publishing Co., 1997)

References

External links
Profile
transcript of interview by beyng.com (foot of page shows 2005/12/12) 16:20(UTC) 27.10.2011
Richard Polt, "Anything But Human", opinion piece in the New York Times, Aug. 5, 2012.
 website maintained by Richard Polt retrieved 16:12(UTC) 27.10.2011
2008.07.23 R.Polt review  from University Notre Dame - College of Arts and Letters 16:33 (UTC) 27.10.2011 [reviewed text : .]

German–English translators
1964 births
Living people
Heidegger scholars
Xavier University people
Translators of Friedrich Nietzsche
Translators of Martin Heidegger